The Women's Gold Cup (India) (known as the  Hero Gold Cup for sponsorship reasons) is a 4-team women's association football tournament organised by the All India Football Federation (AIFF). It was launched in 2019 with the first edition being held at the Kalinga Stadium in association with the Government of Odisha. The tournament naming rights were purchased by Hero MotoCorp which also sponsors the national team.

The first edition was held in 2019, which was won by Myanmar.

Results

Medal summary

References

External links
 Hero Gold Cup

International association football competitions hosted by India
2019 establishments in India
Recurring sporting events established in 2019
International women's association football invitational tournaments